A genset trailer is a range extending device for use with battery electric vehicles consisting of an internal combustion engine and an electric generator (collectively called a genset).  They run on traditional fuels such as gasoline or diesel and are sized to provide the continuous power requirements for the vehicle they are used with.  Most small to midsized passenger vehicles would require  for unlimited freeway travel using fuel.  Larger vehicles could require  or more of power depending on how heavy or un-aerodynamic they happen to be. This essentially converts an electric vehicle into a series-hybrid.

One such trailer was the AC Propulsion backtracking Long Ranger range extending gasoline-fueled trailer, making it a gasoline-electric series plug-in hybrid electric vehicle.  This trailer used a  Kawasaki engine with a  fuel tank and achieved . It was rated at  DC output and could maintain .

The disadvantages of genset trailers are gaseous emissions from the engine, system maintenance, the additional cost of fuel, and storage when it is not in use on the road.  Also, since it is a trailer, it is impractical for some motorists.  

Advantages of a genset trailer include improved efficiency over a dedicated series hybrid when the trailer is disconnected for local travel, additional cargo space and a simpler and more cost effective basic vehicle.  Trailers can additionally be shared or rented for use only when long-distance travel is required.  Similar to a series hybrid, such a combined vehicle would require fewer batteries to achieve an effectively longer range.

See also
 Plug-in hybrid
 Pusher trailer
 Range extender (vehicle)
 Trailer (vehicle)

External links
 www.austinev.org/evalbum/pushers.html — pusher example
 https://web.archive.org/web/20070928075712/http://www.acpropulsion.com/reports/Low_Emiss_Range_Ext.pdf
 evnut.com/rav_longranger.htm — experimental model, also by ACPropulsion, for the Toyota RAV4 EV

Electric vehicles
Trailers
Plug-in hybrid vehicles